The Men's madison at the 2014 UCI Track Cycling World Championships was held on 2 March 2014. 15 teams participated in the contest, which was contested over 200 laps, equating to a distance of .

There was confusion at the end of the race as the Belgian pairing of Jasper de Buyst and Kenny De Ketele celebrated victory when initially declared to be the winners, including a 'final' scoreboard presenting their victory, being cheered by the public, congratulated by the Spaniards and interviewed by the press as winners. But it emerged shortly afterwards that the win had gone to Spain's David Muntaner Juaneda and Albert Torres Barcelo instead. Commissaires held that Spain, as well as (now) silver medallists Czech Republic,  Switzerland, who would become third and (now) fourth-placed Austria, had all gained a lap on the field and the Belgians had not succeeded in reaching the back of the peloton when during these last 30 laps, specifically during the last 10,  part of the pairings was riding scattered over the track.

Medalists

Results
The race was held at 17:35.

References

2014 UCI Track Cycling World Championships
UCI Track Cycling World Championships – Men's madison